Delucemine (NPS-1506) is a drug which acts as an NMDA antagonist and a serotonin reuptake inhibitor, and has neuroprotective effects. It was originally investigated for the treatment of stroke and in 2004 was studied as a potential antidepressant.

Origin 
The basic structure of Delucemine was based on argiotoxin 636, a NMDA antagonist isolated from the venom of the Araneid Argiope aurantia.

See also 
 AD-1211
 Budipine
 Diphenidine
 Ephenidine
 Fluorolintane
 Lanicemine
 Methoxphenidine
 MT-45
 Remacemide

References 

NMDA receptor antagonists
Fluoroarenes
Serotonin reuptake inhibitors